Vrådal, formerly spelled Wraadahl, is a village in Kviteseid municipality, Norway. The village had a population of 220 as of 1 January 2009. The centre of the village is at Eidstod, which lies at the eastern end of the Vråvatn lake, where it flows into lake Nisser. The economy is based on tourism (hotels, camping and a ski-centre), light industry, and small-scale logging.

The name probably derives from the old Norse vrá/ró which means "step", probably used to refer to farms which lay a little remotely - but it could also come from the fact that the valley is curved or "stepped".

The village has a long-church built in 1866, Vrådal kirke.

External links 
 Vrådal Tourist service

Villages in Vestfold og Telemark
Kviteseid